The erect-crested penguin (Eudyptes sclateri) is a penguin endemic to the New Zealand region and only breeds on the Bounty and Antipodes Islands.  It has black upper parts, white underparts and a yellow eye stripe and crest. It spends the winter at sea and little is known about its biology and breeding habits. Populations are believed to have declined during the last few decades of the twentieth century, and the International Union for Conservation of Nature has listed it as being "endangered".

Description

The male is slightly larger than the female and as in most crested penguins has a larger bill. It has bluish-black to jet black upper parts and white underparts, and a broad, bright yellow eyebrow-stripe which extends over the eye to form a short, erect crest.

Its biology is poorly studied and only little information about the species has emerged in the past decades. The only recent study conducted on the Antipodes Islands focused on aspects of the mate choice. Research on the species is hampered by logistics and restrictive permitting by the New Zealand Department of Conservation.  

It presumably feeds on  small fish, krill and squid like other crested penguin species.

The binomial commemorates the British zoologist Philip Lutley Sclater.

Distribution

Erect-crested penguins breed on the Bounty and Antipodes Islands. Previous records of small breeding populations have also been reported from Campbell Island and the Auckland Islands; in the 1940s a breeding pair was documented on the Otago Peninsula on the New Zealand mainland. The species spends extended times at sea during the pre-moult period (February-March) as well as over the winter months (March-August). Individuals have been found as far away as the Falkland Islands and it is also a vagrant to Argentina, Antarctica and Australia. 

Erect-crested penguins nest in large colonies on rocky terrain. On the Antipodes Islands, the penguins breed in mono-specific colonies or sometimes sympatrically with Southern Rockhopper penguins. On the Bounty Islands, Erect-crested penguin breed in large mixed colonies with Salvin's albatross.

Status 
Populations of this species are believed to have declined drastically since the 1940s. Population estimates from the late 1970s put the total numbers of Erect-crested penguins breeding on the Bounty and Antipodes Islands at 230,000 breeding pairs although the accuracy of these figures have recently been questioned. Nevertheless there is ample evidence for substantial population declines in the second half of the 20th century although these declines seem to have slowed in recent decades. The current population is estimated at 150,000 mature individuals and is being listed as an endangered species on the IUCN Red List; the erect-crested penguin is listed as endangered and granted protection under the U.S. Endangered Species Act.

References

External links 

 State of Penguins: Erect-crested penguin – Detailed and current species account of Erect-crested penguins (Eudyptes sclateri)
 ARKive – images and movies of the erect-crested penguin (Eudyptes sclateri)
 Erect-crested penguins at Penguins in New Zealand
 Erect-crested penguins from the International Penguin Conservation website
 www.pinguins.info information about all species of penguins
 Penguin World: Erect-crested penguin

erect-crested penguin
Birds of the Antipodes Islands
Birds of the Campbell Islands
erect-crested penguin
erect-crested penguin